The Georgia Central Railway  operates about  of former Seaboard Coast Line track from Macon, Georgia through Dublin, Georgia and Vidalia, Georgia to Savannah, Georgia. It connects with CSX Transportation and the Norfolk Southern Railway. The Georgia Central Railway is owned by Rail Link, a subsidiary of Genesee & Wyoming Inc.

Despite the name, the Georgia Central is in no way related to the Central of Georgia Railway.

Locomotives
The Georgia Central operates a roster of GE U23B, GE U30B, EMD GP9, EMD GP18, EMD GP38, and EMD SW9 locomotives.

In the early 2010s, the Georgia Central became rather famous, being one of the last railroads in North America to have a complete roster of U23Bs, known as U-Boats. Since then, however, all but one of these units have been scrapped, with the last one residing in Oak Ridge, Tennessee, on the roster of the Southern Appalachia Railway Museum.

History
The Georgia Central Railway was chartered in 1885 as the Macon and Dublin Railroad, to connect its namesake cities. In 1891, it changed its name to the Macon, Dublin and Savannah Railway, even though the railroad did not reach the port city of Savannah. In fact, the original railroad did not go closer to the coast than Vidalia, where it interchanged with the Savannah, Americus, and Montgomery Railroad. In 1912, the MD&S was purchased by the Seaboard Air Line Railroad.  It continued to be operated separately until 1954, when it was fully absorbed into the Seaboard. 

In 1990, a new Georgia Central Railroad was formed by Rail Link, which purchased former Macon, Dublin, and Savannah, and the Savannah, Americus, and Montgomery, from CSX, the Seaboard's successor. The ownership of the Georgia Central changed hands in 2012, when Genesee & Wyoming purchased Rail Link.

Infrastructure 
In 2019, the Georgia Central began improving track conditions so that it can handle 286,000 lb. railcars, the same as class 1 railroads.

See also
Macon, Dublin, and, Savannah Railroad (predecessor)

Savannah, Americus, and Montgomery Railroad (predecessor)

References

External links

 Georgia Central Railway official webpage - Genesee and Wyoming website
 HawkinsRails.net Georgia Central page
 

Georgia (U.S. state) railroads
Genesee & Wyoming
Spin-offs of CSX Transportation